Lanzhou Xinqu railway station is a railway station located in Lanzhou New Area, Yongdeng County in Lanzhou, on the Lanzhou–Zhongchuan Airport Intercity Railway.

It takes about 30 minutes to the Lanzhou West railway station as well as the city proper, although the station is close to the commercial centre of the Qilihe District. The station is opened on 30 September 2015, along with the railway.

Railway stations in Gansu
Railway stations in China opened in 2015